Michael James Vigor (born 17 September 1990) is a Scottish-born Australian professional basketball player for the Willetton Tigers of the NBL1 West. He made his debut in the State Basketball League (SBL) for the Perth Redbacks in 2008 and in 2011 joined the Perth Wildcats of the National Basketball League (NBL) in 2011 as a development player. He won an NBL championship with the Wildcats in 2014 and sn SBL championship with the Redbacks in 2017. He played in Europe between 2015 and 2020, and in 2018 he represented Scotland at the Commonwealth Games.

Early life
Vigor was born in Westhill, Scotland, to an English father and a Scottish mother. He lived there for the first five years of his life before being raised in Australia. Vigor attended Wesley College in Perth, Western Australia, where he played for the school's basketball team. He also played in the Western Australian Basketball League (WABL) for the Perth Redbacks as a junior.

Professional career

SBL, SEABL and NBL1
Vigor debuted in the State Basketball League (SBL) for the Perth Redbacks in 2008. He continued with the Redbacks until 2013. In 2012, he won the SBL Most Improved Player Award.

In 2014 and 2015, Vigor played for the Bendigo Braves in the South East Australian Basketball League (SEABL).

Vigor re-joined the Redbacks in 2016 and was named the team MVP. In 2017, he helped the Redbacks win the SBL championship. He played his ninth season with the Redbacks in 2018.

In 2019, Vigor joined the Lakeside Lightning in the SBL. He continued with the Lightning in 2020 in the West Coast Classic.

In 2021, Vigor joined the Willetton Tigers for the inaugural NBL1 West season. In 19 games, he averaged 16.26 points, 10.57 rebounds, 3.15 assists and 1.15 steals per game. He re-joined the Tigers in 2022 and averaged 11.7 points, 6.7 rebounds and 4.1 assists in 19 games. He re-joined the Tigers for the 2023 NBL1 West season.

NBL and Europe
Vigor was a development player for the Perth Wildcats of the National Basketball League (NBL) between 2011 and 2014. He was a member of the Wildcats' championship-winning team in the 2013–14 season.

In July 2015, Vigor signed with the Plymouth Raiders of the British Basketball League for the 2015–16 season. In 32 games, he averaged 11.5 points per game on 33% shooting from behind the three-point-line.

On 29 June 2016, Vigor signed with the Bristol Flyers for the 2016–17 season. In 33 games, he averaged 9.8 points and 6.6 rebounds per game.

On 31 May 2017, Vigor re-signed with the Flyers and joined the team as captain for the 2017–18 season. In 32 games, he averaged 8.4 points, 6.3 rebounds and 2.9 assists per game.

In December 2018, Vigor re-joined the Flyers for the rest of the 2018–19 season. In 15 games, he averaged 6.5 points, 4.0 rebounds and 2.3 assists per game.

Vigor played in Italy in the 2019–20 season, averaging 16.1 points in 18 games for Libertas Altamura in the Lega Basket Serie C.

National team career
In January 2018, Vigor received his first international call-up for Scotland ahead of the 2018 Commonwealth Games on the Gold Coast. He qualified to play for Scotland through his mother's Scottish heritage. He helped Scotland reach the bronze medal game at the Commonwealth Games, as they finished the tournament in fourth place.

References

External links

Bristol Flyers profile (November 2018)
Bristol Flyers profile (January 2018)
PerformanceBasketball.com.au profile
DaveOwenBasketball.co.uk profile
"Time to meet – Mike Vigor" at bbl.org.uk

1990 births
Living people
Australian men's basketball players
Basketball players at the 2018 Commonwealth Games
Bristol Flyers players
Scottish emigrants to Australia
Centers (basketball)
Commonwealth Games competitors for Scotland
People educated at Wesley College, Perth
Perth Wildcats players
Plymouth Raiders players
Power forwards (basketball)
Sportspeople from Aberdeenshire
Basketball players from Perth, Western Australia
Scottish men's basketball players
Sportsmen from Western Australia
Australian people of English descent
Scottish people of English descent
Australian expatriate basketball people in Italy
British expatriate basketball people in Italy
Scottish expatriate sportspeople in Italy